Cotesia icipe is a parasitoid species of wasp of the genus Cotesia. Found in tropical Africa and the Arabian Peninsula, it was first discovered as a parasitoid of the Lepidopterans Spodoptera littoralis and beet armyworm (Spodoptera exigua). Therefore it is now being studied as a possible biological control of Lepidopteran pests of amaranth crops in those areas.

Range
Kenya (Yatta Constituency, Mwea Constituency, Kitengela, Thika, and Machakos), Madagascar, Saudi Arabia, South Africa, Yemen, and Ethiopia (Awasa (Hawassa), Jimma, and Awash-Melkasa).

Hosts
S. exigua, a native host
S. littoralis, a native host
S. frugiperda - C. icipe is the primary parasitoid of the invasive agricultural pest S. frugiperda in Ethiopia, and a minor one in Kenya.

References

Microgastrinae
Insects described in 2017